Annulus (or anulus) or annular indicates a ring- or donut-shaped area or structure. It may refer to:

Human anatomy 
 Anulus fibrosus disci intervertebralis, spinal structure
 Annulus of Zinn, a.k.a. annular tendon or anulus tendineus communis, around the optic nerve
 Annular ligament (disambiguation)
 Digitus anularis, a.k.a. ring finger
 Anulus ciliaris, a.k.a. ciliary body
 Anulus femoralis, a.k.a. femoral ring
 Anulus inguinalis superficialis, a.k.a. superficial inguinal ring
 Anulus inguinalis profundus, a.k.a. deep inguinal ring
 Anuli fibrosi cordis, a.k.a. fibrous rings of heart
 Anulus umbilicalis , a.k.a. umbilical ring

Other 
 Annulus (construction), outer gear ring in an epicyclic gearing
 Annulus (botany), structure on fern and moss sporangia
 Annular lake, a ring-shaped lake caused by meteor impact
 Annulus (mathematics), the shape between two concentric circles
 Annulus (mycology), structure on mushroom
 Annulus (firestop), site of construction issue
 Annular piston, a ring-shaped piston
 Annulus (well), void between concentric cylinders
 Annular blowout preventer, device for sealing oil and gas wells
 Annulation, type of ring-producing chemical reaction

See also 
 
 
 Annulet (disambiguation)
 Annular eclipse
 Annular tropical cyclone
 Annular combustor, design option in engine
 Ring (disambiguation)